Frederick William Hervey, 2nd Marquess of Bristol PC, FSA (15 July 1800 – 30 October 1864), styled Lord Hervey from 1803 to 1826 and Earl Jermyn from 1826 to 1859, was a British Tory politician. He served as Treasurer of the Household under Sir Robert Peel between 1841 and 1846.

Background and education
Hervey was born at Portland Place, Marylebone, London, the eldest son of Frederick Hervey, 1st Marquess of Bristol, and his wife the Honourable Elizabeth Albana Upton, daughter of Clotworthy Upton, 1st Baron Templetown. Lord Arthur Hervey was his younger brother. He was educated at Eton and Trinity College, Cambridge.

Political career
Styled Earl Jermyn after his father was raised to a marquessate in 1826, he became a member of Parliament as one of two representatives for Bury St Edmunds the same year. In 1841 he was sworn of the Privy Council and appointed Treasurer of the Household in the Tory administration of Sir Robert Peel, an office he retained until the government fell in 1846. He continued to represent Bury St Edmunds in Parliament until 1859, when he succeeded his father in the marquessate and entered the House of Lords. Apart from his political career he was also a Colonel in the West Suffolk Militia and a Fellow of the Society of Antiquaries.

Family
Lord Bristol married Lady Katherine Isabella Manners, daughter of John Manners, 5th Duke of Rutland, in 1830. They had four sons and three daughters:

Hon. Elizabeth Frederica Hervey (1832? – 1 June 1856)
Lady Mary Katharine Isabella Hervey (1833? – 1 August 1928)
Frederick William John Hervey, 3rd Marquess of Bristol (28 June 1834 – 7 August 1907)
Lord Augustus Henry Charles Hervey  (2 August 1837 – 28 May 1875)
Major Lord John William Nicholas Hervey (15 November 1841 – 25 February 1902)
Lady Adeliza Georgiana Hervey (17 August 1843 – 7 November 1911)
Lord Francis Hervey (16 October 1846 – 10 January 1931)

The Marchioness of Bristol died at 47 Eaton Place, London, on 20 April 1848, from smallpox, in a childbed, aged 39. Lord Bristol remained a widower until his death at Ickworth House, Suffolk, on 30 October 1864, aged 64. He was succeeded in the marquessate by his eldest son, Frederick.

References

External links 
 

1800 births
1864 deaths
People educated at Eton College
102
Alumni of Trinity College, Cambridge
British Militia officers
Jermyn, Frederick Hervey, Earl
Fellows of the Society of Antiquaries of London
Frederick Hervey, 2nd Marquess of Bristol
Members of the Privy Council of the United Kingdom
Treasurers of the Household
Jermyn, Frederick Hervey, Earl
Jermyn, Frederick Hervey, Earl
Jermyn, Frederick Hervey, Earl
Jermyn, Frederick Hervey, Earl
Jermyn, Frederick Hervey, Earl
Jermyn, Frederick Hervey, Earl
Jermyn, Frederick Hervey, Earl
Jermyn, Frederick Hervey, Earl
Jermyn, Frederick Hervey, Earl
Jermyn, Frederick Hervey, Earl
Bristol, M2
Politicians from Bury St Edmunds